The Still Alarm is a 1926 American silent drama film directed by Edward Laemmle and starring Helene Chadwick, William Russell, and Richard Travers, based on the 1887 play of the same name.

Plot
As described in a film magazine review, Lucy leaves her husband, fireman Richard Fay, to be with the politician Perry Dunn. Eighteen years later, Dick is a fire battalion chief. His adopted daughter Drina meets the modeste Madame Celeste, who really is the missing Lucy. Dunn decoys Drina to his apartment. Fire breaks out and Dick and his men arrive. Dick discovers Drina in the building and gets her away to safety, and then thrashes Dunn. Trapped in the flames, he lowers Dunn to safety. Dick and his men escape along a narrow cornice, pressed against the wall in single file, until out of the building. Drina is taken home by Lucy, and later a reconciliation follows.

Cast

Preservation
A print of The Still Alarm, on loan from a private collector, is in the collection of the Library of Congress.

References

Bibliography
 Munden, Kenneth White. The American Film Institute Catalog of Motion Pictures Produced in the United States, Part 1. University of California Press, 1997.

External links

1926 films
1926 drama films
Silent American drama films
American silent feature films
1920s English-language films
Universal Pictures films
Films directed by Edward Laemmle
American black-and-white films
1920s American films